Baidyer Bazar Union is a union, the smallest administrative body of Bangladesh, located in Sonargaon Upazila, Narayanganj District, Bangladesh. The total population is 19,797.

References

Unions of Sonargaon Upazila